Sergio Jiménez (born 19 October 1940) is a Chilean fencer. He competed in the individual épée event at the 1964 Summer Olympics.

References

External links
 

1940 births
Living people
Chilean male épée fencers
Olympic fencers of Chile
Fencers at the 1964 Summer Olympics
20th-century Chilean people
21st-century Chilean people